The Medal of the Armed Forces in the Service of the Fatherland is a Polish military decoration, awarded for long service and excellent work in the army. The medal was first established on 26 May 1951, and the detailed rules and grades were revised in 1991 and 1995. Until 1968, it was a state distinction awarded by the head of state; from 1968 it was a departmental award, granted by the Minister of Defence. It continues to be presented as an award of the Ministry of Defence, as the Long Service Medal is a state-awarded decoration, conferred on an individual basis to selected recipients only.

There are three grades, Gold, Silver and Bronze, awarded for 25, 15 and 5 years, respectively. The ribbon is red with double white edge stripes and a central gold or silver stripe for gold and silver awards.

Notable recipients 
 Andrzej Andrzejewski
 Janusz Bojarski
 Mieczysław Cygan
 Jarosław Florczak
 Franciszek Gągor
 Wojciech Jaruzelski
 Andrzej Karweta
 Roman Krzyżelewski
 Bronisław Kwiatkowski
 Johnny R. Miller
 Stanislav Poplavsky
 Włodzimierz Potasiński
 Józef Urbanowicz

References 

Military awards and decorations of Poland